Leinster League is a rugby union competition.

Leinster League may also refer to:

 Leinster Senior League (rugby union)
 Leinster Senior League (association football)
 Leinster Senior League (cricket)